The Philadelphia Athletics were a professional American football team based in Philadelphia in 1902. The team was member of what was referred to as the National Football League. This league has no connection with the National Football League of today. The whole "league" was a curious mixture of baseball and football. During the league's only year in existence, two of the three teams that were financed by the owners of the Philadelphia Athletics and the Philadelphia Phillies, hence the names Philadelphia Athletics and Philadelphia Phillies. The Pittsburgh Stars made up the third team and was suspected of being financed by the Pittsburgh Pirates baseball team.

History

Origins
The Athletics began as a part of the baseball wars between the National League and the new American League that began in 1901. In Philadelphia, the AL's Athletics lured several of the NL's Phillies from their contracts, only to lose them again through court action. When Phillie owner John Rogers decided to start a football team, the Athletics followed suit. A's owner Ben Shibe fielded a team made-up of several baseball players as well as some local football talent. He appointed his baseball manager Connie Mack as the team's general manager and named former Penn player, Charles "Blondy" Wallace as the team's coach. Each Philadelphia team was named after their respective baseball clubs and became the Philadelphia Athletics and Philadelphia Phillies.  However both Rogers and Shibe knew that to lay claim to the World Championship, they had to play a team from Pittsburgh, which was the focal point of football at the time. They called upon Dave Berry, pro football promoter, and a Pittsburgh team was soon formed. These three teams are all that made up the first NFL.

Upon hiring Wallace as coach of team, Shibe primarily put Mack in the manager position to watch over Wallace. Mack wasn't an expert on football, but he had always been careful with Shibe's money and his sports teams. Nevertheless, Wallace began signing the best football talent available. The Phillies had a headstart, but A's soon caught up until Philadelphia rosters began to look like a "Who's Who of Phialdelphia Football talent".

Rube Waddell
Many of the baseball players came from the Major League Baseball teams. The Athletics' star left-hander, Rube Waddell. When in the mood, he could throw a baseball better than anyone in the world, but he wasn't always in the mood. Newspapers of the time charitably referred to Waddell as "eccentric" while others ranked him between "screwball" and "nutsy." When football began, Connie saw a chance to keep his star in line for a few months more. He signed the lefty on as an extra lineman, against Waddell's recommendation that he be placed at halfback. While there is no mention of Waddell's name in any lineups or game accounts, Wallace may have let the lefty into a few games when the score was safe. Regardless, it was no secret to anyone that the Rube was there to be watched.

1902 season

First Stars game
The league played all of its games on Saturdays, since there were no Sunday sports events according to Pennsylvania blue laws in 1902. The teams began playing various colleges and local football clubs before finally playing each other. On November 8, the Stars traveled to Philadelphia to play the A's. In the first half Pittsburgh scored two touchdowns but failed on each extra point attempts (PAT). In 1902, the PAT was more difficult than those of today. It had to be kicked from a point straight out from where the ball crossed the goal line on the TD. If the angle was bad, the scoring team's fullback punted the ball out into the field from behind the goal line. The extra point man had first to field the punt-out, and then, kick from where he'd caught the ball. If the fullback couldn't give the kicker good field position, he didn't stand a chance on his try. The Athletics also got a touchdown and added the point. Until 1912 a touchdown counted only five points, so the score at the half stood 10-6. However, the A's were not content to be the first team to score against the Stars; they added a second-half field goal—also five points, the same as a touchdown. Under modern scoring, the game would have been a 12-10 Pittsburgh victory. In 1902 scoring it was 11-10, Philadelphia.

Issues with Waddell
Mack was still more committed to baseball than football and worried more about losing Rube Waddell than any football game. In Elmira, Waddell was tempted to remain in a town that was the home of one of the biggest manufacturers of fire engines, which he loved. Mack had to then convince Rube to stay with the team.

Then the night before the first championship game try with Pittsburgh, Connie caught Rube sneaking into the hotel long after curfew. After being delivered a lecture by Mack, Waddell turned to return to his hotel room. However, a loaded pistol dropped out of his pocket and went off. The bullet missed Mack's head by inches.

First championship try
The Athletics had split on the 1902 season with the Phillies, as had Pittsburgh. Although a Philadelphia victory on Thanksgiving Day would give the A's the championship hands down, a win by the Stars could tie the league race tighter than a toper on Saturday night. The game going to be billed by Dave Berry, the league president and manager of the Stars, as the championship game.

Mack prepared the A's for the big game by playing an exhibition tour through northern Pennsylvania and southern New York. In Elmira, New York the Athletics joined in the first night game in pro football history. Lights were set up along the sidelines and giant searchlights glared from behind the goal posts.

When Mack agreed to the championship game, he was promised $2,000 in return for his team's participation. When he saw that the stands were practically empty, he refused to play until his team was paid their share of the gate. With the stands almost empty, it looked as if the game wouldn't be played. However, Mack soon after received a check for $2,000 from William Corey, the head of Carnegie Steel who impatiently wanted to see the game, and the game soon began. Corey got his money's worth, if he liked evenly matched games. Both teams played at their best and sweated to a scoreless tie. It was a fair verdict, but Dave Berry's "championship game" hadn't decided anything.

1902 Championship
Another championship game was soon planned between Berry and Mack. The crowd was a little better that day, but not by much. Only about 2,000 fans showed up. With less than three minutes left in a scoreless game, neither team had yet been able to score a point. Everyone was about ready to contend with another tie. However, a late fumble led to a Pittsburgh touchdown and another touchdown soon followed. The Stars won the championship. Meanwhile, the Athletics went home and beat the Phillies to wrap up second place. It was a nice win and gave them the city championship.

Controversy
With the win, A's players decided to call the Stars game an exhibition, and declared themselves the champs. However, the team had agreed to that season-ending championship game against Pittsburgh the Saturday after Thanksgiving, and they had lost it. This was recognized by all parties at the time as the championship game. Each team carried a record of 2-2 for league play. Pittsburgh had by far the better point ratio, scoring 39 points to their opponents' 22. Both the Athletics and the Phillies gave up more points than they scored in their league games. Finally Dave Berry used his power as league president and name his Stars the 1905 champions.

In late December of that same year the 1902 World Series of Football was held at Madison Square Garden in New York City. While neither the Phillies nor Athletics participated in this event, several members of both squads joined together on a team known variously as "New York", the New Yorks and the New York Philadelphians. The "New York" team played in the first indoor football game against the Syracuse Athletic Club. The Philadelphia Athletics Football Club finished the 1902 season some $4000 in debt. Mack reorganized the team for the 1903 season but the squad played only two games, a 0-12 defeat at the hands of the Watertown Red & Black and a 6-0 victory over the All-Syracuse eleven, before folding.

Seasons
1902 Philadelphia Athletics (NFL) season
1903 Philadelphia Athletics (NFL) season

References

External links
Phillies vs. Athletics National Football League, 1902

 
American football teams established in 1902
American football teams disestablished in 1903
American football teams in Philadelphia
Defunct American football teams in Pennsylvania
Defunct sports teams in Pennsylvania
National Football League (1902) teams